Atriofronta is a genus of worms belonging to the family Actinoposthiidae.

Species:
 Atriofronta polyvacuola Dörjes, 1968

References

Acoelomorphs